The Kingston Point station, MP 0.0, was one of the last stations built on the Ulster and Delaware Railroad (U&D). It was built in Kingston Point, New York to permit passengers and cargo to be transferred between the U&D and boats transiting the Hudson River between Albany and New York. It was also adjacent to Kingston Point Park, which was an attraction in itself, and there was a nearby trolley depot.

Originally, passengers for the U&D unloaded on the Rondout Creek at Rondout and boarded trains on the U&D at the station located there. As boats became larger, they could no longer easily navigate the shallow and narrow waters of the Roundout Creek. In order to facilitate the connection with the larger boats, the U&D extended its rail line approximately one mile east on fill over a tidal swamp to deep water on the Hudson River.

The U&D stopped passenger service to the station in 1924. The day-liner service stopped shortly after the Great Depression. Most of the buildings in the park, including the station, were demolished. Only the trolley depot survived, though it has since been rebuilt.

The tracks to the Point were also the tail of a switchback that remained in freight service until 1977. Today the Trolley Museum of New York operates a trolley on the former U&D tracks to Kingston Point.

External links
 Trolley Museum of New York

Railway stations in the Catskill Mountains
Hudson River
Former Ulster and Delaware Railroad stations
Railway stations in Ulster County, New York
Former railway stations in New York (state)